Hero is a 1982 British  independent adventure-fantasy film written and directed by Barney Platts-Mills. Set in the medieval age, it is spoken entirely in Scottish Gaelic.

The film was entered into the main competition at the 39th edition of the Venice Film Festival.

Plot

Cast 

 Derek McGuire 	as Dermid O'Duinne 
 Caroline Kenneil 	as Princess Grannia 
 Alastair Kenneil 	as Finn MacCumhaill 
 Stewart Grant 	as Osin
 Harpo Hamilton 	as Oscar

References

External links

1980s adventure films
1982 fantasy films
Films directed by Barney Platts-Mills
British adventure films
British fantasy films
1982 drama films
1982 films
1980s British films
Scottish Gaelic-language films